Papagou B.C., or Papagou Athens B.C. (alternate spelling: Papagos) is a Greek professional basketball club that was founded in 1976. The team is located in Papagou, Attica, Greece. The club's full name is Athlitikos Syllogos Papagou Athens Basketball Club, which is abbreviated as A.S. Papagou Athens B.C. (Greek: Α.Σ. Παπάγου Αθήνα K.A.E.).

Logos

History
The club's parent athletic association was founded in 1966. Ten years later, in 1976, the men's basketball club was founded. Papagou was promoted into the major Greek basketball division in 1990. The team spent seven seasons there in the 1990s, and had success in the 1996–97 season, and especially in the 1997–98 season, by beating Peristeri in the first round of the Greek League playoffs, before losing to PAOK in the second round. Led in that era by the great scorers Alphonso Ford and Georgios Diamantopoulos, they finished 7th in the Greek League in the 1996–97 season, and gained a qualification to the following 1997–98 season's FIBA Korać Cup competition. They would make one more appearance in that European-wide 3rd-tier level competition, during the 1998–99 season.

More recently, the Papagou basketball team struggled to hold on to its position in the top league in Greece, the first division Greek Basket League. In the 1998–99 season, the team competed in the Greek first division, for the last time in recent years.

Arena
The team's home arena is "Saloun" Indoor Hall, which is located approximately two miles away from downtown Papagou.

Titles and honors
Greek 2nd Division Champion (3):
1990, 1993, 1995,2022

Retired numbers

Notable players

Greece:
  Antonis Asimakopoulos
  Georgios Bosganas
  Kostas Charissis
  Georgios Diamantopoulos
  George Dikeoulakos
  Periklis Dorkofikis
  Nikos Filippou
  Memos Ioannou
  Sotiris Katoufas
  John Korfas
  Alexis Kyritsis
  Georgios Limniatis
  Sotiris Manolopoulos
  Nikos Michalos
 - Michalis Misunov
  George Papadakos
  Michalis Romanidis
  Georgios Sigalas
  Michalis Yfantis
  Alexandros Zabetakis
 - Anatoly Zourpenko

Europe:'
  Stephen Arigbabu

USA:
  Tony Costner
  Derrek Farr
  Alphonso Ford
  Greg Foster
  Lowell Hamilton
  Tony Harris
  Todd Mitchell
  Mikki Moore
  Lawrence Moten
  Anthony Pelle
  John Shasky
  Tony White
  Randy Woods

Africa:
  Alaa Abdelnaby

Head coaches
 David Stergakos
 Kostas Diamantopoulos
 Kostas Missas
 Michalis Kyritsis
 John Korfas
 Minas Gekos
 Dinos Kalampakos

External links
Official Team Site 
Official Team Blog 
Eurobasket.com Team Profile

Basketball teams in Greece
Basketball teams established in 1976